Judge Block may refer to:

Frederic Block (born 1934), judge of the United States District Court for the Eastern District of New York
Lawrence J. Block (born 1951), judge of the United States Court of Federal Claims

See also
Alan N. Bloch (born 1932), judge of the United States District Court for the Western District of Pennsylvania